Mormoscopa phricozona is a moth of the family Noctuidae. It is found in Australia. It was described by Alfred Jefferis Turner in 1902.

References

Herminiinae
Moths described in 1902
Taxa named by Alfred Jefferis Turner